This is a list of members of European Academy of Sciences and Arts.

I – Humanities

II – Medicine

III – The arts

IV – Natural sciences

V – Social sciences, law and economics

VI – Technical and environmental sciences

VII – World religions

References

External links
Members at European Academy of Sciences and Arts

 
Science-related lists
Arts-related lists
Lists of members of learned societies